The Port of Pasni is located in Pasni City in the Balochistan province of Pakistan. The facilities include modern fish harbour, port, and a naval base for the Pakistan Navy.

See also
Pasni Fish Harbour

References

Populated places in Balochistan, Pakistan
Ports and harbours of Pakistan
Coastal cities and towns in Pakistan
Proposed transport infrastructure in Pakistan
Economic development in Pakistan